XHENX-FM is a radio station on 104.3 FM in Mazatlán, Sinaloa, Mexico. It is owned by Radio Cañón and broadcasts a Regional Mexican format known as La Más Guapa.

History

XHENX received its concession on November 5, 1959, as XENX-AM broadcasting on 1270 kHz, though it would soon slide up to 1290. It was owned by Difusoras de Mazatlán, S.A. During its formats are: La Poderosa N-X (grupera), Fiesta Latina (hits in Spanish and English), and 90x Radio Extrema (pop).

It was sold to ABC in 2004 and became Radio Mujer, a talk format aimed at women.

XENX migrated to FM in 2011. In April 2018, operation of XHENX and XHVOX-FM 98.7 transferred to Grupo Siete, which instituted its La Jefa Regional Mexican format on the station. In February 2022, Grupo Siete dropped operation of both stations after nearly four years with the "La Más Buena" brand used at two stations in Guerrero brought to Mazatlán; this was tweaked later in the year to "La Más Guapa".

References

Spanish-language radio stations
Radio stations in Sinaloa